Miroslav Pašajlić (born February 7, 1995) is a Serbian professional basketball player for the Helios Suns of the Slovenian League.

Professional career
Pašajlić started his professional career with Vojvodina Srbijagas in 2012 and played one season there. In the summer of 2013, he signed with Sloboda Užice and stayed there for two seasons. On April 23, 2015, it was announced that he would enter the 2015 NBA draft, but the player later withdrew from it.

On August 5, 2015, he signed a three-year contract with the Bosnian team Igokea. He debuted for the team in 67–56 loss to Cedevita Zagreb in Round 1 of the ABA League, scoring 5 points in 12 minutes of action.

On August 17, 2017, he signed with KK Bosna Royal. On December 8, 2017, he left Bosna and signed with Vršac.

References

External links
 Miroslav Pašajlić at aba-liga.com
 Miroslav Pašajlić at draftexpress.com
 Miroslav Pašajlić at eurobasket.com

1995 births
Living people
ABA League players
Basketball League of Serbia players
BC Balkan Botevgrad players
KK Bosna Royal players
KK Dynamic players
KK Igokea players
KK Metalac Valjevo players
KK Sloboda Užice players
KK Vojvodina Srbijagas players
KK Vršac players
Serbian expatriate basketball people in Bosnia and Herzegovina
Serbian expatriate basketball people in Bulgaria
Serbian expatriate basketball people in Slovenia
Serbian men's basketball players
Basketball players from Novi Sad
Point guards
Serbian men's 3x3 basketball players
Helios Suns players